Jean Alciede Marie Marcland (Limoges, 1903 - 26 February 1964) was a French composer of film music. He also wrote popular tunes under the name Marc Lanjean.

Discography
Musique Aux 4 Vents with Roger Roger

Selected filmography
 Rue des Saussaies (1951)
 Eighteen Hour Stopover (1955)

References

1903 births
1964 deaths
People from Limoges
French film score composers
Deaths from cancer in France